David Russell Key (born March 27, 1968) is a former American football player.  He played college football as a defensive back for the University of Michigan from 1987 to 1990 and in the National Football League for the New England Patriots in 1991.

Early years
Key was born in Columbus, Ohio, in 1968. He attended Bishop Hartley High School in Columbus.  He played football at Hartley and led the team to the Division IV state championship game in 1985. He also was a member of the track team and led the team to Division II state titles in 1985 and 1986.

University of Michigan
Key enrolled at the University of Michigan in 1986 and played college football as a defensive back for head coach Bo Schembechler's Michigan Wolverines football teams from 1987 to 1989 and for Gary Moeller's team in 1990.  He started 36 consecutive games at the cornerback position for Michigan from 1988 to 1990.  Over his four years at Michigan, he had 166 tackles, eight fumble recoveries, seven pass breakups, and two interceptions.

Professional football
Key was selected by the New England Patriots in the sixth round (140th overall pick) of the 1991 NFL Draft and appeared in three games for the Patriots during the 1991 NFL season.

References

1968 births
Living people
American football defensive backs
Michigan Wolverines football players
New England Patriots players
Players of American football from Columbus, Ohio